Many films, books, and other media have depicted the Korean War in popular culture. The TV series M*A*S*H is one well known example. The 1959 novel The Manchurian Candidate has twice been made into films. The 1982 film Inchon about the historic battle that occurred there in September 1950 was a financial and critical failure. By 2000 Hollywood alone had produced 91 feature films on the Korean War. Many films have also been produced in South Korea and other countries as well.

Film

Compared to World War II, there are relatively few Western feature films depicting the Korean War.

American films
The Steel Helmet (1951) is a war film directed by Samuel Fuller and produced by Lippert Studios during the Korean War. It was the first studio film about the war, and the first of several war films by producer-director-writer Fuller.
Battle Hymn (1957) stars Rock Hudson as Colonel Dean Hess, a preacher who became a pilot. He accidentally destroyed a German orphanage during World War II, and rejoins the USAF in Korea; he rescued orphans during that war.
The Bamboo Prison (1954) stars Robert Francis, E.G. Marshall and Brian Keith in a story set in a North Korean POW camp.
The Bridges at Toko-Ri (1955) stars William Holden as a Naval Aviator assigned to destroy the bridges at Toko Ri, while battling doubts; it is based on a James Michener novel.
The Forgotten (2004) features a decimated tank unit, lost behind enemy lines, battling the vicissitudes of the war as well as their own demons.
 The Hunters (1958), adapted from the novel The Hunters by James Salter, stars Robert Mitchum and Robert Wagner as two very different United States Air Force fighter pilots in the midst of the Korean War.
 The Hook (1963), starring Kirk Douglas, portrays the dilemma of three American soldiers on board a ship who are ordered to kill a North Korean prisoner of war.
 Inchon (1982), portrays the Battle of Inchon, a turning point in the war. Controversially, the film was partially financed by Sun Myung Moon's Unification Movement. It became a notorious financial and critical failure, losing an estimated $40 million of its $46 million budget, and remains the last mainstream Hollywood film to use the war as its backdrop. The film was directed by Terence Young and starred an elderly Laurence Olivier as General Douglas MacArthur.
 The Manchurian Candidate, a 1959 thriller novel, was cinematically adapted to The Manchurian Candidate (1962), directed by John Frankenheimer, and featuring Frank Sinatra and Angela Lansbury. It is about brainwashed POWs of the US Army and an officer's investigation to learn what happened to him and his platoon in the war. The 2004 remake starred Denzel Washington and Meryl Streep.
 MASH: A Novel About Three Army Doctors, by Richard Hooker (pseudonym for H. Richard Hornberger), was later adapted into a successful film and a television series.
 Pork Chop Hill (1959) is a Lewis Milestone-directed film with Gregory Peck as an infantry lieutenant fighting the bitterly fierce first Battle of Pork Chop Hill, between the US Army's 7th Infantry Division, and Chicom (Chinese Communist) forces at war's end in April 1953. The movie is lampooned by the Firesign Theatre album Don't Crush That Dwarf, Hand Me the Pliers in the story of Lieutenant Tirebiter.
 The McConnell Story (1955) Air Force pilot Joseph C. McConnell who served as a navigator in World War II before becoming the top American ace during the Korean War.
Battle Circus (1953). A love story of a hard-bitten surgeon and a new nurse at a M.A.S.H. unit. It starred Humphrey Bogart and June Allyson and was directed by Richard Brooks.
Fixed Bayonets! (1951), U.S. soldiers in Korea surviving the harsh winter of 1951. Directed by Samuel Fuller.
Men of the Fighting Lady (1954), Fictional account of U.S. Navy pilots flying F9F Panther fighter jets on hazardous missions against ground targets. Directed by Andrew Marton and starring Van Johnson.
Target Zero (1955), U.S., British, and South Korean troops are trapped behind enemy lines.
Men in War (1957), an American film directed by Anthony Mann and starring Robert Ryan and Aldo Ray.
P.O.W. (1953), an American teleplay about soldiers recovering from brainwashing and abuse in a Communist prisoner of war camp
Prisoner of War (1954), starring Ronald Reagan.
Devotion (2022), starring Jonathan Majors, Glen Powell.

Australian filmsBirthday Boy (2004) is a short animated film directed by Sejong Park and produced by Andrew Gregory. It depicts a young boy Manuk playing on the streets of a village in war-stricken Korea. When Manuk returns home he receives a package containing soldier's personal effects. Unable to read and too young to understand its meaning he mistakes the package for a birthday present. The film won 30 film festival awards and was also nominated for Academy Award for Best Animated Short Film.

British films
 A Hill in Korea (1956) is a British war film. The original name was Hell in Korea, but was changed for distribution reasons, except in the U.S. It was directed by Julian Amyes and the producer was Anthony Squire.

Canadian filmsKorea: The Unfinished War (2003) is a documentary written and directed by Canadian Brian McKenna, which provides new information and adopts an objective editorial line. It interviews researches that allege that the US committed war crimes by using biological warfare on North Korean territory. The documentary provides information that certain munitions found on the battlefield point to the use of anthrax, bubonic plague and encephalitis by US forces. It also provides information that the US Army deliberately killed civilians on a large scale for fear that the communists were infiltrating them.

South Korean films
 The Marines Who Never Returned (1963), directed by Lee Man-hee. A film about South Korean marines fighting to the last man against North Korean and Chinese soldiers during the Korean War.
 Spring in My Hometown (1998), directed by Lee Kwang-mo. Though not focused especially on the fighting, takes place in a South Korean village during the war as it deals with the war's upheavals.
 Joint Security Area (2000), directed by Park Chan-wook. In the DMZ (Korean Demilitarized Zone) separating North and South Korea, two North Korean soldiers have been killed, supposedly by one South Korean soldier. The investigating team suspects a cover-up is taking place, but the truth is much simpler and much more tragic. Starring Lee Young-ae, Lee Byung-hun, Song Kang-ho, Kim Tae-woo, and Shin Ha-kyun.
 Taegukgi: The Brotherhood of War (2004), directed by Kang Je-gyu. It became extremely popular in South Korea. At the 50th Asia Pacific Film Festival Taegukgi won Best Film, while Kang Je-gyu was awarded Best Director. Taegukgi saw a limited release in the United States. Starring Jang Dong-gun, Won Bin, and Lee Eun-ju.
 Welcome to Dongmakgol (2005), directed by Park Kwang-hyun. It shows the effect of the warring sides on a remote village. The village becomes home to surviving North Korean and South Korean soldiers, who in time lose their suspicion and hatred for each other and work together to help save the village after the Americans mistakenly identify it as an enemy camp.
 71: Into the Fire (2010), directed by John H. Lee. Starring Cha Seung-won, Kwon Sang-woo, T.O.P, Kim Seung-woo, and Park Jin-hee. 
 Road No. 1 (2010), directed by Lee Jang-soo and Kim Jin-min. Starring So Ji-sub, Kim Ha-neul, and Yoon Kye-sang.
 The Front Line (2011), directed by Jang Hoon. Also known as Battle of Highlands, it is set during the 1953 ceasefire. Starring Shin Ha-kyun, Go Soo, Lee Je-hoon, and Ko Chang-seok.
 Operation Chromite (2016), directed by John H. Lee (Lee Jae-han). Starring Lee Jung-jae, Lee Beom-soo, and Liam Neeson.

North Korean films
In North Korea the Korean War has always been a favorite subject of film, both for its dramatic appeal and its potential as propaganda. The North Korean government film industry has produced many scores of films about the war. These have portrayed war crimes by American or South Korean soldiers while glorifying members of the North Korean military as well as North Korean ideals. Some of the most prominent of these films include:

 Unsung Heroes, a multi-part film produced between 1978 and 1981 which included in the cast several American soldiers who had defected to North Korea. It tells the story of a spy in Seoul during the Korean War.Wolmi Island, a film based on real life about coastal artillerymen of the Korean People's Navy led by lieutenant Ri Tae Hun who defended Wolmi Island to the last man during the US landing at Inchon.Order No. 027, a martial arts film about a unit of Korean People's Army special forces sent behind South Korean lines on a mission to destroy the headquarters of an R.O.K. Special Forces unit and capture priceless documents.

Chinese films
 Battle on Shangganling Mountain (1956) is a famous Chinese war movie about the Battle of Triangle Hill. The story is centered around a group of Chinese soldiers that were trapped in a tunnel several days. Short of both food and water, they hold their grounds till the relief troops arrive. The movie's popularity is largely due to the fact it was one of the few movies that were not banned during the Cultural Revolution.
 Assembly (2007): Parts of this movie depicts Chinese forces in the Korean War, specifically around a special squad of artillery spotters.
 The Sacrifice (2020): The July 12–13, 1953 events of the film at Geumgang River are presented in three main segments from three different perspectives: "Soldiers", "Adversaries", and "Gunners". These are followed by a final segment, "Bridge".
 The Battle at Lake Changjin (2021)
 The Battle at Lake Changjin II (2022)
 Sniper (2022)

Philippine films
 10th Battalion sa 38th Parallel, Korea was directed by Gerardo de León.
 Korea (1952) was directed by Lamberto V. Avellana with screenplay by Benigno Aquino Jr.
 Batalyon Pilipino sa Korea (1954) was directed by Carlos Vander Tolosa.
 Lagablab sa Silangan (1956) was directed by Constancio T. Villamar.
 The Forgotten War (2009) tells about Filipinos who fought the battle of Yultong.

 Turkish films 

Literature
In South Korea novelists Pak Wansŏ and Ch’oe Yun and film director Kang Chegyu use the war experience to explore geography, time, memory, and history. Their narratives are set decades after the war ended, but emphasize long-term memories and results.
 Choi In-hun's The Square is one of the most important novels about the Korean War from the 1960s.
 Jo Jung-rae's ten-volume Taebaek Mountain Range was one of the most popular novels in the 1980s. It also covers the Korean War.
 The essay Who are the Most Beloved People? (1951) by Chinese writer Wei Wei is considered to be the most famous literary and propaganda piece produced by China during the Korean War.
 The war-memoir novel War Trash (2004), by Ha Jin, is a drafted PVA soldier's experience of the war, combat, and captivity under the UN Command, and of the retribution Chinese POWs feared from other PVA prisoners when suspected of being unsympathetic to Communism or to the war.

Music
Singer-songwriter David Rovics sings about the Korean War in his song "Korea" on the album Song for Mahmud.

Opera
The Peking opera Raid on the White Tiger Regiment is set in July 1953; it depicts a victory of the Chinese and Korean communists over South Korean and American forces.

PaintingMassacre in Korea (1951), by Pablo Picasso, depicts war violence against civilians.

Sculpture
Australia: Korean War Memorial, Canberra
United States: Korean War Veterans Memorial

Television and newsreels
 West German newsreels for theatrical release often carried an antiwar commentary. For example, the September 1950 issue included the following  spoken text:
In Korea, however, a war is being waged without mercy. New, dangerous situations have arisen for UN forces. The North Koreans launched an unexpected general offensive. The enemies accuse each other of the cruelest war crimes. The wretchedness of mankind is brought home to us. Goodness is peace, evil is war; peace is freedom and war is violence. There is no good reason for man to go to war--anywhere in the world!

M*A*S*H (1972–83); based on the novel and film (see above), the TV series had a total of 251 episodes, lasted 11 years, and won awards. Its final episode was the most-watched program in television history. Yet the sensibilities they presented were more of the 1970s than of the 1950s; the Korean War setting was an oblique and uncontroversial treatment of the then-current American war in Vietnam.Carl Freedman, "History, Fiction, Film, Television, Myth: The Ideology of MASH." Southern Review 26.1 (1990): 89+.Junwoo (1975–78): a South Korean series.Legend of the Patriots (2010): a South Korean series.
In the British sitcom Fawlty Towers, Basil Fawlty is a British Korean War veteran, claiming to have killed four men; his wife Sybil then says that he was in the Army Catering Corps and poisoned them with his cooking. Basil has been described as "the most famous and mocked fictional veteran of the Korean War."
In the HBO show Lovecraft Country (TV series)'s sixth episode, "Meet Me in Daegu", the entire story takes place in Korea during the war. The main character Atticus, is a veteran of the war.

Theater
The Colombian theatrical work El monte calvo (The Barren Mount), created by Jairo Aníbal Niño, used two Colombian veterans of the Korean war, and an ex-clown named Canute to criticize militarist and warmongering views, and to show what war is and what happens to those who live through it.

References

Further reading
 Brockett, Gavin D. "The Legend of ‘The Turk’ in Korea: Popular Perceptions of the Korean War and Their Importance to a Turkish National Identity." War & Society 22.2 (2004): 109-142.
 Chung, Hye Seung. "From Saviors to Rapists: GIs, Women, and Children in Korean War Films." Asian Cinema 12.1 (2001): 103–116.
 Danel, Thibaud. "Bodies of War and Memory: Embodying, Framing and Staging the Korean War in the United States." Miranda. Revue pluridisciplinaire du monde anglophone/Multidisciplinary journal on the English-speaking world 15 (2017).
 David, Joel. "Remembering the Forgotten War" Kritika Kultura 28 (2017), re: films online
 Edwards, Paul M. A Guide to Films on the Korean War (Greenwood, 1997)
 Fox, Levi. Not Forgotten: The Korean War in American Public Memory, 1950–2017 (Temple UP, 2018).
 Freedman, Carl. "History, Fiction, Film, Television, Myth: The Ideology of MASH." Southern Review 26.1 (1990): 89+.
 Herzon, Frederick D., John Kincaid, and Verne Dalton. "Personality & public opinion: The case of authoritarianism, prejudice, & support for the Korean & Vietnam wars." Polity 11.1 (1978): 92-113.
 Hwang, Junghyun. "'I’ve Got a Hunch We’re Going Around in Circles': Exceptions to American Exceptionalism in Hollywood Korean War Films." American Studies in Scandinavia 49.1 (2017): 61–82. online
 Jackson, Andrew David. "South Korean Films About the Korean War: To the Starry Island and Spring in My Hometown." Acta Koreana 16.2 (2013): 281+ online.
 Keene, Judith. "Cinema and Prosthetic Memory: The Case of the Korean War." PORTAL: Journal of Multidisciplinary International Studies 7.1 (2010). online
 Kim, Susie Jie Young. "Korea beyond and within the Armistice: Division and the Multiplicities of Time in Postwar Literature and Cinema." Journal of Korean Studies 18.2 (2013): 287-313 online.
 Lentz, Robert J. Korean war filmography: 91 English language features through 2000 (McFarland, 2016).
 Long, K. "The Korean War in American feature films." Education about Asia 7.3 (2002): 16–23. online; covers Steel Helmet, Retreat Hell!, Battle Hymn, Men of the Fighting Lady, and Pork Chop Hill Matray, James I. "Korea's war at 60: A survey of the literature." Cold War History 11.01 (2011): 99-129.
 Mueller, John E. "Trends in Popular Support for the Wars in Korea and Vietnam 1." American Political Science Review 65.2 (1971): 358–375.
 Pash, Melinda L. In the Shadow of the Greatest Generation: The Americans Who Fought the Korean War (NYU Press, 2012).
 Peters, Richard, and Xiaobing Li. Voices from the Korean war: Personal stories of American, Korean, and Chinese soldiers (UP of Kentucky, 2014).
 Smith, Howard. "The BBC television newsreel and the Korean War." Historical Journal of Film, Radio and Television 8.3 (1988): 227–252.
 Solomonovich, Nadav. "The Turkish Republic's Jihad? Religious symbols, terminology and ceremonies in Turkey during the Korean War 1950–1953." Middle Eastern Studies 54.4 (2018): 592–610. online
 Stamm, Karl. "The `Neue Deutsche Wochenschau' (1950): West German newsreel coverage of Korea and the virtues of peace,"  Historical Journal of Film, Radio & Television (1993) 13#1 pp. 69–73.
 Wehrle, Edmund F. "'Syndromes' and 'Solutions': The Korean War and The Vietnam War, 1950–1973." Diplomatic History (2020).
 Wetta, Frank Joseph, and Stephen J. Curley. Celluloid wars: a guide to film and the American experience of war (Greenwood, 1992).
 Williams, Tony. "Beyond Fuller and MASH: Korean War Representations in Film, Genre, and Comic Strip." Asian Cinema 20.1 (2009): 1-14.
 Young, Charles S. "Missing action: POW films, brainwashing and the Korean War, 1954–1968." Historical Journal of Film, Radio and Television'' 18.1 (1998): 49–74.